Sushila Karki (born 7 June 1952  in Biratnagar) is a Nepalese jurist. She is the former Chief Justice of the Supreme Court of Nepal and the only woman to have held the post. Karki became Chief Justice on 11 July 2016. The Constitutional Council headed by the Prime Minister KP Oli recommended her for the post.

On 30 April 2017, an impeachment motion was submitted in the Parliament against Karki, by Maoist Centre and Nepali Congress. However, the impeachment motion was later withdrawn after public pressure and an interim order by the Supreme Court ordering the Parliament not to proceed with the motion.

Personal life
Karki is the eldest child among her parents' seven children. She belongs to Karki family of Biratnagar. She married Durga Prasad Subedi, whom she met while studying in Banaras. Durga Subedi was a popular youth leader of Nepali Congress at that time. Subedi is most known for his part in the hijacking of an aircraft during the Nepali Congress' protest against the Panchayat Regime.

Education
In 1972, she completed a Bachelor of Arts (BA) degree  from the Mahendra Morang  Campus, Biratnagar. In 1975, Karki earned her master's degree in political science from Banaras Hindu University, Varanasi, India. She earned her bachelor's degree in law from Tribhuvan University in Nepal in 1978.

Career
In 1979 she started her law practice in Biratnagar. Karki initially worked as an assistant teacher in Mahendra Multiple Campus, Dharan in 1985. She became a senior Advocate in 2007. Karki was appointed an Ad-Hoc Justice at the Supreme Court on 22 January 2009  and a permanent Justice on 18 November 2010. Karki served as acting Chief Justice of the Supreme Court of Nepal from 13 April 2016 to 10 July 2016, then as Chief Justice of the Supreme Court until 7 June 2017.

Notable decisions 
 Om Bhakta Rana v. CIAA/Government of Nepal (Sudan Peacekeeping Mission Corruption)
 Office of Nepal Trust v. Prerana Rajya Laxmi Rana (Property of former Royal Princess)
 Prithivi Bahadur Pandey v. Kathmandu District Court (Corruption in the printing of polymer bank notes in Australia)
 Kathmandu Nijgarh Fast Track Case
 Surrogacy Case

Literary career 
Karki has published two books. Her first autobiographical book Nyaya was published on September 28, 2018.

Her second book was a novel named Kara which was published in December 2019. It is set in Biratnagar Jail where Karki herself was kept during Panchayat regime.

References

External links
 Interview with Sushila Karki, BBC Nepali Service

1952 births
Living people
Justices of the Supreme Court of Nepal
20th-century Nepalese lawyers
21st-century Nepalese women politicians
21st-century Nepalese politicians
People from Morang District
People from Biratnagar
Women chief justices
Chief justices of Nepal
Mahendra Morang Adarsh Multiple Campus alumni
Nepal Law Campus alumni
21st-century Nepalese judges